Hateley is a surname. Notable people with the surname include:

Barbara "BJ" Gallagher Hateley (born 1949), inspirational author and speaker who lives in Los Angeles, California
Linzi Hateley (born 1970), English stage actress
Mark Hateley (born 1961), retired English football player
Tom Hateley (born 1989), English professional footballer
Tony Hateley (1941–2014), former footballer who played for numerous English clubs as a striker

See also
Hateley Heath, residential area of West Bromwich in the West Midlands of England